Jazz is a 2006 picture book by Walter Dean Myers, illustrated by Christopher Myers. The picture book is a collection of illustrations and rhyming text celebrating the roots of Jazz music.

Synopsis 

Jazz is a collection of poetry and illustrations that interprets the styles and roots of Jazz music including Ragtime, Swing, Bebop, and fusion.

Reception 
Publishers Weekly called the book a "mesmerizing verbal and visual riff on a uniquely American art form." Kirkus Reviews praises this book that "stands as a welcome addition to the literature of jazz: In a genre all too often done poorly for children, it stands out as one of the few excellent treatments."

Jazz was named a Coretta Scott King Award honor book for illustration.

References 

2006 children's books
Music books